"Dead Wrong" is a song by American rapper The Notorious B.I.G. featuring fellow American rapper Eminem, taken from the former's third overall album, Born Again. The song features background vocals from Diddy and it was released as a single posthumously in 1999.

Critical reception
It was received positively by music critics. Rolling Stone wrote a positive overview: "The only real find here is the awesome "Dead Wrong," which shows B.I.G. in his prime." A.V. Club wrote that Eminem is a highlight.

Music video
The video was set out in a similar manner to Tupac's song "Changes", which was released in 1998, in the fact that it features clips of Biggie performing live, in interviews, clips of his music videos and showing pictures of him. Eminem appears in the video in a separate clip, rapping his lyrics in the style of a freestyle video submission. The YouTube version of the video doesn't feature him.

In other media 
This song was mashed up with Led Zeppelin's "Whole Lotta Love" from the 2006/2007 mixtape Rock Phenomenon, which features the alternate second verse coming from the Notorious B.I.G. in legacy. The line "relax and take notes" is also put in a mix for the mixtape introduction, provided and contributed by DJ Vlad & Roc Raida with Linkin Park's Mike Shinoda as the host for the album. The song was also sampled in the song "Relax And Take Notes", a song by 8Ball & MJG which features Project Pat, from their 2007 album Ridin High. The last verse and hook were performed at the Up in Smoke Tour by Eminem and D12 member Proof.

In other albums 
Curtain Call: The Hits (Deluxe Edition) (Eminem, 2005)
Greatest Hits (The Notorious B.I.G., 2007)
Bad Boy 20th Anniversary Box Set Edition (Bad Boy Records, 2016)

Track listing

Charts

References

1999 singles
1999 songs
Bad Boy Records singles
Eminem songs
Gangsta rap songs
Horrorcore songs
Songs released posthumously
Songs written by Eminem
Songs written by the Notorious B.I.G.
The Notorious B.I.G. songs